Callimetopus paracasta is a species of beetle in the family Cerambycidae. It was described by Stephan von Breuning in 1965. It is known from Borneo.

References

Callimetopus
Beetles described in 1965